Shooting Star Children's Hospices is an English children's hospice charity (No: 1042495). The charity cares for babies, children and young people with life-limiting conditions, and their families, across Surrey and West London. They provide specialist clinical and holistic care to families from diagnosis to end of life and throughout bereavement. 

Shooting Star Children's Hospices offers bespoke support free of charge to families. This includes a comprehensive range of therapies and support groups, specialist nursing care and respite, symptom management, end-of-life care, and bereavement support. They currently support around 700 families who have a baby, child, or young adult with a life-limiting condition, or who have been bereaved. They have two children's hospices: Christopher's, in Artington near Guildford, and Shooting Star House in Hampton, London.

History 
Shooting Star Children's Hospices was formed in 2011 from the merger of two existing children's hospices. CHASE (Children's Hospices Association for the South-East) and The Shooting Star Trust combined to become Shooting Star Chase, which later became Shooting Star Children's Hospices in February 2019.

CHASE was registered as a charity on 13 November 1994 after founder Julia Lever MBE was prompted by an article in a national newspaper describing the plight of a family living with their life-limited daughter. Julia soon realised there was no comparable service in South-East England. CHASE introduced its Community Care team on 10 May 1999 and Christopher's children's hospice was opened in November 2001. In 1995, Kate Turner MBE established The Shooting Star Trust with the aim of providing a home-from-home environment offering medical and practical services free of charge to families in South-West London. The charity was named Shooting Star Trust in recognition of children with life-limiting conditions, who, like shooting stars, shine bright but are gone far too soon. In 2005, Shooting Star House children’s hospice in Hampton opened. Within the first month, the hospice had been used by 26 children with life-limiting conditions. 

Andrew Coppel is the current Chair of Trustees. 

Chief Executive Paul Farthing joined the charity in September 2021. 

The Countess of Wessex is currently Royal Patron. Other Patrons include Simon Cowell, Lauren Silverman, Dame Joan Collins, Tony Hadley, Michael Ball and Phillip Schofield.

Services 
The charity offers support free of charge to families, 365 days a year. They have two purpose-built hospices, designed to offer a home-from-home environment whilst also providing a specialist staff, facilities and equipment to support children with complex needs and their families. 

Christopher’s provides overnight care, including respite, symptom management stays, emergency respite and end-of-life care, as well as a range of therapies. Facilities include a sensory room, hydrotherapy pool, soft play, and cinema room. The hospice has bedrooms equipped with a range of specialist beds and hoists, and family flats for respite stays. There are also bereavement suites for end-of-life care and post bereavement, as well as memory and sensory gardens.

Shooting Star House currently provides Outreach, Therapy and Family Support. The hospice offers counselling, complementary therapies, drama, art and music therapy, and family support sessions. Like Christopher’s, Shooting Star House has a hydrotherapy pool, sensory room, soft play, arts and crafts room and gardens for play and remembrance. Families are also able to self refer and book sessions for the hydrotherapy pool, arts and crafts room and sensory room.

Catchment Area 

The charity provides its services across Surrey and the London Boroughs of Brent, Croydon, Ealing, Hammersmith and Fulham, Harrow, Hillingdon, Hounslow, Kensington and Chelsea, Kingston upon Thames, Merton, Richmond upon Thames, Sutton, Wandsworth and Westminster. It currently supports around 700 families.

Funding 
Shooting Star Children's Hospices receives some central government funding, but the majority of its revenue comes from donations and fundraising. The charity's flagship fundraising challenge event, the Sunrise Walk Series, takes place in the summer with walkers setting off just before sunrise for a 10k or 20k walk. The series includes a rural Guildford route through the Surrey countryside and parts of the North Downs Way and a Richmond walk that includes Richmond Park, Bushy Park and the grounds of Hampton Court Palace. The charity also has teams representing it at the London Marathon, RideLondon, the Brighton Marathon, The Royal Parks Half Marathon and the London Landmarks Half Marathon.

The charity receives the support of a number of local and regional corporate partners and supporters, who hold company fundraising events, offer sponsorship and volunteering support.

A large amount of fundraising is also generated through local communities, from individuals, schools and education as well as dedicated ‘Friends of Shooting Star Children’s Hospices’ groups.

Shooting Star Children's Hospices also runs seven charity shops, which are located in Cobham, Godalming, Guildford, Hampton Hill, Shepperton, Teddington, and Weybridge.

References

External links 
 

Charities based in England
Palliative care in England
2011 establishments in England